Aleksei Aleksandrovich Kurzenyov (born 9 January 1995) is a Russian professional football player.

Club career
He made his debut in the Russian Premier League on 25 April 2014 for FC Amkar Perm in a game against FC Krylia Sovetov Samara.

He played for PFC CSKA Moscow in the 2013–14 UEFA Youth League.

References

External links
 
 
 
 
 Aleksei Kurzenyov at CFU2015

1995 births
People from Zelenodolsk, Russia
Living people
Russian footballers
Sportspeople from Tatarstan
Association football forwards
Russia youth international footballers
Russia under-21 international footballers
PFC CSKA Moscow players
FC Lokomotiv Moscow players
FC Amkar Perm players
FC Academia Chișinău players
FC Sokol Saratov players
FC Dnepr Mogilev players
FC Ararat Moscow players
FC Zenit-Izhevsk players
FC Krymteplytsia Molodizhne players
FC Volga Ulyanovsk players
FC Salyut Belgorod players
Russian Premier League players
Moldovan Super Liga players
Russian First League players
Belarusian Premier League players
Crimean Premier League players
Russian Second League players
Russian expatriate footballers
Expatriate footballers in Moldova
Russian expatriate sportspeople in Moldova
Expatriate footballers in Belarus
Russian expatriate sportspeople in Belarus